Venice High School (VHS) is a public school located in the Westside area of Los Angeles, California and within the Local District West area of the Los Angeles Unified School District (LAUSD).

History

The school was established in 1911 (then called "Venice Union Polytechnic High School") when classes were held in an old lagoon bathhouse two blocks from the beach. It moved to a new neo-romanesque structure at its present 29-acre campus two miles inland a decade later.

A famous statue, installed in 1922 and for which then-unknown Venice High School student Myrna Loy served as model, stood on the front lawn of Venice High School for over 70 years. An unsightly cage was erected to prevent vandalism, but the statue was ultimately removed and sent to indoor storage in 1998.  However, a bronze-cast replacement statue was mounted before 2,000 cheering onlookers in an April 2010 ceremony.

On March 10, 1933, the school was seriously damaged by the 1933 Long Beach earthquake.  As a result, classes were held in hastily constructed tents for two years until a replacement school was built.  Art Deco earthquake-resistant buildings were built in 1935, and are still used by the school today.

It was in the Los Angeles City High School District until 1961, when it merged into LAUSD.

Beginning in fall 2007, some neighborhoods zoned to Hamilton High School were rezoned to Venice High School.

On May 15, 2009, students staged a walkout in response to LAUSD increasing class sizes and cutting teachers. Students who engaged in the walkout received support from the ACLU and the National Lawyers Guild in clearing their truancies on that particular day. A similar walkout occurred in 1951 when school administration disqualified a candidate for student body office because of a questionable campaign speech. Administration retaliated by focusing on agitators within the heretofore self-selective service clubs, suspending the clubs and then reorganizing them later with a more pliant membership. Small protests (e.g. graffiti, lawn burnings, tree fellings) continued sporadically for a year.

Support
Venice High is greatly supported by numerous community partnerships, parent groups, Booster, and Alumni associations. Venice is known for offering many Advanced Placement classes and having an excellent athletics program.

Demographics
During the 2011–2012 school year, 69% of Venice High students were Hispanic/Latino, with 12% white/European Americans, 10% African Americans and 8% Asian Americans.

Academics and academic performance
VHS has four Small Learning Communities (SLCs):
 Academy of Law and Public Service
 Media, Arts & Technology Academy
 School for Advanced Studies (SAS) and GATE
 Sports Medicine

VHS also has two magnet programs:
 World Language and Global Studies Magnet
 STEMM (Science Technology Engineering Mathematics and Medicine) Magnet

As of 1998, the school has mathematics and science programs and a magnet program that explores international politics. Additionally, as of 2017, the World Languages and Global Studies Magnet offers courses in Mandarin Chinese, Japanese, Italian, French and Spanish.

Venice High School won back-to-back National Science Bowl championships in 1996 and 1997, and won regional championships in 1993, 1994 and 2005.  Venice High School is one of only three schools that have won two National Science Bowl championships.

In 1998 Richard Lovett, the president of the Creative Artists Agency (CAA), gave self-esteem courses to the students, and Terry Hardy of Los Angeles Magazine wrote that the CAA "has adopted Venice High as its very own."

School's student news site 
The school's student news site, called The Oarsman, began as a school newspaper. Written Voice, a literary journal started in the spring of 2012, features students' poetry, short stories, and other work.  An unofficial News magazine, The Venice Independent, was formerly run by Venice students.

Athletics
An historically successful sports competitor, Venice High fields 16 sports with most teams competing in the Western League of the CIF LA City Section.  The football team has won 9 of the last 10 Western League titles, as well as the 2021 CIF City D1 Championship. The baseball team has won five City championships (1967, 1972, 1984, 1985, 1986).  The girls' softball team won the CIF LA City Section Invitational Tournamemt in 2005 and a CIF LA City Section Division 2 championship in 2013. The basketball team won the City championship in 1948. The boys' swimming team won three consecutive City Championships in the 1950s (even before the school had an on-campus pool). The school also captured the City Championship in golf in 2009, 2011 and 2012. The boys' volleyball team won back-to-back City Championships in 1991 and 1992. The boys' coss country team has won three City Championships (1948, 2018, 2019). The boys soccer team won a City Championship in 1975 and the girls team won three straight from 2019-2021. Plus, the boys swim team won City Championships in 1950, 1951, 1994, 1996, 1907, 1998, 2000. Also, the girls teenis team won Division II City Championships in 1991, 2006, 2011, 2017. The boys volleyball team won City Chapionships in 1991 and 1992, while the girls team won a Division II City Championship in 2012 and a Division I Championship in 2016.

Eight graduates have appeared in Major League Baseball and NFL games in the last 20 years.

Filming location
Venice High School was used as the Rydell High School location for the 1978 movie Grease—in which the opening shot was the Myrna Loy statue.  The school was also used in other movies such as A Nightmare on Elm Street, American History X, Matchstick Men, and Heathers, as well as in several music videos, including Britney Spears' international hit "...Baby One More Time", Bowling for Soup's "High School Never Ends", Cher Lloyd's "Oath", and Young MC's "Principal's Office".  Venice is also in The Faders' "No Sleep Tonight". Additionally, aerial photographic images of the school were used to show the location of the high school in the 1987 movie Masters of the Universe. The campus was also used for the TV show Glee on an episode ("Yes/No", aired January 17, 2012) which recreates the classic "Summer Nights" scene from Grease, as made famous by John Travolta and Olivia Newton-John (and filmed on the same location). The Australian TV series Rake also used Venice High School as a filming location. The music video for Alesso's 2014 song "Cool" was also shot here.

Neighborhoods zoned to Venice
Several neighborhoods, including Venice, Marina del Rey, Mar Vista, and Del Rey, feed into Venice High School. The unique educational pathways offered by the six small schools draw students from across Los Angeles. Three University of California Los Angeles (UCLA) student housing facilities for families are zoned to Venice High School. They include Rose Avenue Apartments, University Village, and Venice-Barry Apartments. Rose Avenue had been rezoned from Hamilton High School to Venice in 2007.

According to both the City of Los Angeles's Venice Community Plan map  and LAUSD's Venice High School Modernization Plan, the school is located in Venice.  However, according to the Los Angeles Times Mapping L.A. project, it is in the adjacent neighborhood of Mar Vista.

Nearby elementary and middle schools
Elementary schools in the Venice High district include Beethoven Elementary, Mar Vista Elementary, Playa del Rey Elementary, Broadway Elementary, Braddock Drive Elementary, Stoner Avenue Elementary, Short Avenue Elementary, Walgrove Avenue Elementary, Westminster Avenue Elementary School and Coeur d'Alene Avenue Elementary School. Marina Del Rey Middle School, Daniel Webster Middle School, Mark Twain Middle School, and Palms Middle School feed into Venice. Until LAUSD established sufficient capacity in the area during the immediate post-World War II period, Culver City-based Betsy Ross Elementary, now closed, had been the largest single feeder to the then 7–12th grade high school.

Notable alumni

Larry Atkins, NFL linebacker, Kansas City, Oakland 1999–2004
 David Blu, led Israeli team to 2004 Euroleague basketball championship
Cliff Bourland, 1948 Summer Olympics 4X400 gold medal; US 400m champion
Craig Breedlove, land-speed world record holder 
Beau Bridges, film actor
John Bromfield, actor, television star
Les Clark, legendary Disney animator and one of Disney's Nine Old Men
Leon Clarke, NFL end 1956–63, twice in Pro Bowl
John Clayton, jazz and classical double bassist
Gary Collins, actor and TV personality 
Walter Cunningham, NASA astronaut, (Apollo 7 pilot)
Marceline Day, actress
Karen Fukuhara, actress
Crispin Glover, actor
Gogi Grant (Myrtle Audrey Arinsberg), singer
Skip Guinn, Major League Baseball pitcher
Irene Hervey, actress
Shin Hye-sung,  South Korean singer and lead vocalist of six-member boy band Shinhwa
 Donna Loren, singer and actress; "Dr Pepper girl"
J. P. Losman, NFL quarterback, Buffalo, Oakland 2004–09, Miami 2011
Myrna Loy, (Myrna Williams), film actress, voted "Queen of Hollywood" in 1938
Teena Marie (Mary Christine Brockert), singer, songwriter, producer
Dana McLemore, NFL defensive back, New Orleans, San Francisco, 1982–87
Betty Miller (pilot) first female pilot to fly solo across the Pacific Ocean
Jonas Mouton, NFL linebacker, San Diego, 2011–2014
Andrea Murez (born 1992), Israeli-American Olympic swimmer
Morris Nettles, former Major League Baseball player
Steven Okazaki, filmmaker
Peggy Oki, surfer, skateboarder, artist, environmental activist
Stacy Peralta, skateboarder, surfer, documentary film director
Don Perry, 6-time AAU and NCAA champion in gymnastic rope climb, world record holder
Doug Slaten (1980–2016), MLB pitcher for the Washington Nationals
Harry Snyder, founder of In-N-Out hamburger chain
Joanie Sommers (Joan Drost), singer, "Pepsi Girl"
Larry Stevenson, skateboard pioneer, designer
Esther Takei Nishio, selected as a "test case" as the first World War II internee of Japanese descent to return from camp and enroll in a California university
Jerry Turner, MLB player from 1974–83 for the San Diego Padres, Detroit Tigers, and Chicago White Sox

Hall of Fame
The Venice High School Hall of Fame was introduced by the Venice High School Alumni Association in 2017. The inaugural inductees were Beau Bridges (class of 1959), John Clayton (1969), Walter Cunningham (1950), Robby Duron (faculty), Skip Engblom, (1967), Bill Fairbanks (faculty), Artie Harris (faculty), Donna Loren (1963), Myrna Loy (1921; posthumous), Abbot Kinney (posthumous), Dana McLemore (1978), Ken Medlock (1967), Audrey O'Brien Griffin (1954), Peggy Oki (1973), Billy E. Paney (faculty), George Rose (faculty), Jeffery Shimizu (faculty), Harry Snyder (1932; posthumous), Tony Vazquez (1973), Clifford L. Warner (1980), and Sam Whipple (1978).

See also

References

External links
 
 Venice High School history
 Venice High School Alumni Website
 The Oarsman's official website
 Venice High's demographics from LAUSD
 LAUSD demographics for the foreign language magnet run out of the same campus
 Graduating class Summer 1959

Art Deco architecture in California
Educational institutions established in 1911
High schools in Los Angeles
Los Angeles Unified School District schools
Magnet schools in California
Mar Vista, Los Angeles
Public high schools in California
School buildings completed in 1935
UCLA Bruins basketball venues
Venice, Los Angeles
1911 establishments in California